Weiss Hall, also known as the Judge Edmund Taylor House, is a historic dormitory located on the campus of Wilkes University at Wilkes-Barre, Luzerne County, Pennsylvania.  It was built about 1895, and is a 2 1/2-story, stone, brick, and shingled building in the Queen Anne style.  It features a tower, recessed third floor balcony, steep gables, a large side porch, and stained glass windows.  It was built as a residence and later acquired by Wilkes College and used as a residence hall.

It was added to the National Register of Historic Places in 1972.

References

Buildings and structures in Wilkes-Barre, Pennsylvania
Wilkes University
Residential buildings on the National Register of Historic Places in Pennsylvania
Residential buildings completed in 1895
Greek Revival houses in Pennsylvania
National Register of Historic Places in Luzerne County, Pennsylvania